Norton is a village in the Wychavon district of Worcestershire,  from the boundary of the City of Worcester, England. The village sits within the Norton Juxta Kempsey civil parish and is split in two by the M5 motorway, with the original village to the east.

The village saw considerable development in 1990s, mainly centred on the large decommissioned military Norton Barracks, which have been converted into apartments.

The village is the location of St Peter's Garden Centre and Worcester Cricket Club. Worcester Norton Hockey Club also originates from the village, but now play and train at nearby Nunnery Wood High School, Worcester.

Economy
In 1939 Morganite Crucible, a subsidiary of Morgan Crucible, opened its works in the village. In 2010 the site, now closed, was sold for use as an industrial estate, but a Morgan presence remains in the form of Molten Metal Products Ltd, distributors of Morgan products, owned by two ex-Morgan employees, Dave Hill and Jim Ritchie.

A permanent military presence was established in the village with the completion of Norton Barracks in 1877.

Transport
Worcestershire Parkway railway station opened on 23 February 2020. This has a platform on the Birmingham to Bristol line with CrossCountry services which link to Cardiff, Bristol to the south also Birmingham and Nottingham to the north. There is another platform on the Oxford route to Worcester with Great Western Railway services.

References

Villages in Worcestershire
Wychavon